The Convention on the issue of multilingual extracts from civil status records is a multilateral convention, drafted by the International Commission on Civil Status which defines a uniform format for extracts on civil status (birth, marriage, death). The convention was signed in Vienna 8 September 1976 by 12 European states, and entered into force 30 July 1983 upon the ratification of the 5th state. As 17 October 2015, the convention is in force in 23 European countries and Cape Verde; the convention is open for accession to any state.

Obligations
State parties are obliged to issue multilingual extracts on request and accept the abstracts of other countries and handle them not differently from national extracts: "they shall be handled without legalisation or equivalent formality in the territory of each state". They should provide translations of basic items on status records (e.g. Death of the husband) for inclusion by the other state parties.

Format
Extracts are to be produced in the language of the issuing country, in French and one other language on the front with optional translations in the other deposited languages on the back. The certificates are known as Formule A for births, Formule B for marriages and Formule C for deaths.

References

Human rights instruments
Treaties concluded in 1976
Treaties entered into force in 1983
Vital statistics (government records)
Identity documents
International Commission on Civil Status treaties
Treaties of Austria
Treaties of Belgium
Treaties of Bosnia and Herzegovina
Treaties of Bulgaria
Treaties of Cape Verde
Treaties of Croatia
Treaties of Estonia
Treaties of France
Treaties of Germany
Treaties of Italy
Treaties of Lithuania
Treaties of Luxembourg
Treaties of North Macedonia
Treaties of Moldova
Treaties of Montenegro
Treaties of the Netherlands
Treaties of Poland
Treaties of Portugal
Treaties of Romania
Treaties of Serbia and Montenegro
Treaties of Slovenia
Treaties of Spain
Treaties of Switzerland
Treaties of Turkey
Treaties of Yugoslavia
1976 in Austria